Eupithecia tepida is a moth in the family Geometridae. It is found in north-western China (Shaanxi).

The wingspan is about 19 mm. The fore- and hindwings are pale fawn.

References

Moths described in 2004
tepida
Moths of Asia